Raúl del Valle (1908 in Chile – 21 January 1973, in La Rioja, Argentina) was a Chilean film and theatre actor who performed for most of his career in Argentina.

Career 
Del Valle was a prominent character actor who performed in more than 40 Argentine films and worked with well-known actors such as Hugo del Carril, Dora Baret, Libertad Leblanc, and Armando Bo among others.

Death 
Del Valle died of myocardial infarction whilst shooting the film La muerte de Sebastián Arache y su pobre entierro (The Death of Sebastián Arache and his poor burial). He death was shot on camera. He was 64 years old on the day of his death.

Filmography

1940s 

 1941: El cantar de mis penas
 1942: En el viejo Buenos Aires
 1946: Inspiración
 1947: El precio de una vida (Played Boroff)
 1948: Rodríguez, supernumerario
 1948: Tierra del fuego
 1949: Con el sudor de tu frente
 1949: Ángeles de uniforme
 1949: Se llamaba Carlos Gardel
 1949: Diez segundos

1950s 

 1950: La barca sin pescador
 1950: Arrabalera
 1951: El pendiente
 1951: La calle junto a la luna
 1952: Nace un campeón
 1952: El gaucho y el diablo
 1952: El infierno verde
 1952: Las aguas bajan turbias
 1954: Sin familia
 1954: Días de odio (Played The Sailor)
 1954: La tigra (Played Olivera)
 1954: Llampo de sangre
 1955: Embrujo en Cerros Blancos
 1956: Después del silencio
 1957: El hombre señalado
 1958: El festín de Satanás
 1958: Hombres salvajes
 1958: Sin familia
 1959: Cavalcade
 1959: Cerro Guanaco
 1959: Las tierras blancas

1960s 

 1960: Shunko
 1961: Alias Gardelito
 1961: Esta tierra es mía
 1962: Reencuentro con la gloria
 1963: Testigo para un crimen
 1963: El último montonero
 1964: Así o de otra manera
 1965: Esquiú, una luz en el sendero
 1966: Fuego en la sangre
 1966: Los días calientes
 1966: La cómplice
 1969: Eloy (Played Hernández)
 1969: Desnuda en la arena

1970s 

 1970: Una cabaña en la pampa
 1972: Intimidades de una cualquiera
 1973: Paño verde
 1973: Si se calla el cantor
 1974: La muerte de Sebastián Arache y su pobre entierro

References 

1908 births
1973 deaths
Chilean male film actors
Argentine male film actors